Ammoides is a genus of flowering plants in the Apiaceae, comprising 2 species. It is endemic to northern Africa and southern Europe.

References 

Apioideae
Apioideae genera